Picnomon is a genus of flowering plants in the tribe Cardueae within the family Asteraceae.

Species
The only known species is Picnomon acarna, native to Europe, Asia, and Africa from Portugal and the Canary Islands to Kazakhstan.

References

Cynareae
Monotypic Asteraceae genera
Taxa named by Michel Adanson